Fremont Pass may mean one of the following:

Mountain passes
Fremont Pass (Colorado) – a pass on the Continental Divide of the Americas in Lake County, Colorado, United States
Fremont Pass (Nevada) – a pass in Washoe County, Nevada, United States
Fremont Pass (Utah) – a pass in Garfield County, Utah, United States
Newhall Pass - Beale's Cut Stagecoach Pass – a pass separating the San Gabriel Mountains from the Santa Susana Mountains, once mistakenly known as "Fremont Pass"